The 45th New Brunswick Legislative Assembly represented New Brunswick between May 28, 1963, and September 8, 1967.

Joseph Leonard O'Brien was Lieutenant-Governor of New Brunswick in 1963. He was succeeded by John Babbitt McNair in 1965.

Bernard A. Jean was chosen as speaker. H.H. Williamson became speaker in 1966 after Jean was named to the Executive Council.

The Liberal Party led by Louis Robichaud formed the government.

History

Members 

Notes:

References 
 Canadian Parliamentary Guide, 1967, PG Normandin

Terms of the New Brunswick Legislature
1963 establishments in New Brunswick
1967 disestablishments in New Brunswick
20th century in New Brunswick